Baldaccini is an Italian surname. Notable people with the surname include:

 Alex Baldaccini (born 1988), Italian mountain runner
 César Baldaccini (1921–1998), French sculptor
 Jesús Baldaccini (born 1986), Argentinian footballer

Italian-language surnames